Majeed Ullah Khan Farhat is the president of Majlis Bachao Tehreek (MBT) in Hyderabad in the Indian state of Telangana, He is controversial due to his views and as a main opponent of All India Majlis-e-Ittehadul Muslimeen (AIMIM).

Majeed Ullah Khan Farhat is the son of five-time MLA Amanullah Khan. He is the contested MLA from the Yakutpura Assembly constituency and convener to the Bahujan Left Front (BLF). He is an engineer.

Majeed Ullah Khan Farhat is the exponent behind Majlis Bachao Tehreek political Operations.

Political career

Khan is been very controversial as he was arrested in Terrorist and Disruptive Activities (Prevention) Act or TADA ACT in the year 1993 and was in police custody for 3 months and in judicial custody for 9 months on the suspicion of having links with the accused of 1993 Bombings
His father and their party ran a movement saying this was a dirty game of their opponent AIMIM to weaken their movement to rebuild the Babri Masjid. Following this Khan gained a huge popularity and was granted bail after a year just before 1994 AP Assembly elections his party due to the popularity won 2 seats i.e. his father from Chandryangutta Constituency and their close aide Mumtaz Khan from Yakutpura Constituency party reduced the AIMIM to single seat

1999 Assembly elections
Their close aide Mumtaz Khan switched sides and turned in favour of their arch rival AIMIM and contested on their ticket. So Khan for the first time ran for election but lost in a close fight

2004 General election
Khan ran for the Hyderabad Parliamentary against Asaduddin Owaisi and secured 3rd place with 47,000 votes

2014 Telangana assembly election
After a gap of a decade Khan returned on the election battle ground fully charged. Khan had a huge wave in his support. He was addressing thousands of people in his public meetings. Election looked one sided. He was contesting against Mumtaz khan who defeated him earlier. One the day of voting, Khan was arrested for violating model code if conduct. Khan alleged that his arrest was pre planned to weaken him. Khan lost the election once again to Mumtaz Khan he got 28,000 votes and secured 3rd place.

2018 Assembly Election
He was caught up in a controversy. He openly gave death threat to Bhartiya Janta Party Member of Legislative Assembly T. Raja Singh and challenged him to come and fight him. This statement had very mixed reactions 
He contested the election and secured 23000 votes

Controversy
He is caught up in many controversies 
In 1992 he was arrested on terror charges
At a rally in 2004 he was booked for hurting hindu sentiments.
At a rally in the year 2007 he again was booked for hurting hindu sentiments
He openly in a public meeting gave death threat to BJP legislator in the year 2018 
He made very inappropriate remark on the prime minister of India in a speech in the year 2016 
At a rally against alair encounter he told that we will hang the killers of muslim boys and was booked for disturbing the peace between two communities

Titled Mujahid-E-Millat
After khan spent almost two years in jail for the BABRI cause and stood against all the odds and faced the brutality and tourturement of police he was given the title Mujahid-E-Millat meaning the “WARRIOR OF ISLAM” from his followers. He is very famous for his title

Education
He completed his schooling from St Paul’s High School Hyderguda. He has a degree of Civil Engineering from Karnataka University. He has qualified the prelims of UPSC and didn’t appear for the mains

Personal life
 
Khan was born on 19 November 1969 in Hyderabad.He is the fourth child of 7 siblings. He married on 23 August 1997 to Mohammedi Khatoon and the couple has four sons. He is the elder brother of Amjed Ullah Khan

References

External links
 
 

1972 births
Indian political party founders
Living people
21st-century Indian politicians
Politicians from Hyderabad, India
Majlis Bachao Tehreek politicians